North Fork Crystal River is a tributary of the Crystal River in Gunnison County, Colorado. The stream flows from a source in the Maroon Bells-Snowmass Wilderness to a confluence with the South Fork Crystal River in the White River National Forest that forms the Crystal River.
Class VI rapids not usually run, do not attempt to run at peak or high flows. Short but very continuous whitewater.

See also
List of rivers of Colorado

References

Rivers of Colorado
Rivers of Gunnison County, Colorado
Tributaries of the Colorado River in Colorado